Qila Sobha Singh (Punjabi) is a town in Narowal District of Punjab province of Pakistan. Before 1 July 1991 it was part of Sialkot District but after 1 July 1991 it was made part of Narowal District.

History 
There are numerous sources which trace the origins of the town but the authenticity of many of these sources varies. The less-reliable historical sources about the origins of the city have been derived from the oral traditions based on ancient local beliefs which, most historians concur, are full of inaccuracies, concocted legends and erroneous facts and pertain to the Vedic scriptures which give a description of the ancient city. These are, nonetheless, stated here. More reliable and validated historical references relating to the city date back to centuries in which it has been stated that the city is of Persian and/or Greek origin. The evidences reveal that it was a bastion of Sikhism and the town was ruled by a Sikh Maharaja. The origin of the town is related to a Sikh land owner called Sobha Singh. When Sobha Singh was married, his father gave him the lands surrounding the part of Qila Sobha Singh. The name Qila implies a fort; this name originates in the fact that Sobha Singh's family had a very large and tall mansion, which was surrounded by smaller houses. Because there was a wall surrounding the whole town with several gates, the town had the appearance of a fort.
Also Sobha sing has three other brothers named as Mian singh, Deedar Singh,

During the Indian rebellion of 1857, British troops while tracking down the rebels kept on scouring the area and arrived at the Qila and surrounded it, believing it to be a fort. Representatives of the town people, however, managed to convince the troops that the town was not in fact a fortification.

In 1947, the year of Pakistan's independence from the British Indian Empire, Qila Sobha Singh was a very small town with mainly Sikh and Hindu population. Most of the Sikhs and Hindus living in the town moved to the Indian part of the Punjab and many Muslim immigrants moved to the area from the East Punjab and settled over there.

Climate 
Qila Sobha Singh features a humid subtropical climate under the Köppen climate classification. Qila Sobha Singh is chilly during winters; and tepid, humid and sultry during summers. May and June are the hottest months. The land is, generally, plain and fertile. Most of the rain falls during the Monsoon season in summer which often results in flooding and deluge.

Saga about construction of Qila 
It is widely believed – and this yarn has been spun by the people of the town that when ever the Sikh Maharaja thought of constructing the fort and started constructing the fort it kept on dilapidating intermittently. An eminent sorcerer told the Maharaja that when any Muslim will be immolated at the threshold of the fort then it will not dilapidate any more. Meanwhile, a saint, Peer Syed Baba Balaq Shah Walli (R.H) told the Maharaja that if he will drop one drop of blood at the place of fort, instead of the immolation of a Muslim, then it will also not dilapidate. It was witnessed that when the saint dropped one drop of blood from his finger at the threshold of the fort, afterwards it never became dilapidated. A shrine of that saint was built near that fort. The duties of the shrine were on His Grandson's son "Peer Syed Saqlain Shah Bukhari" but on his death on 14 August 2001, his sons took the duties of the shrine under the leadership of "Peer Syed Raza Saqlain Bukhari". A large number of believers come to the shrine on every Thursday with firm belief and food called "Langar" is distributed among them with great respect. The Urs of saint "Peer Syed Baba Balaq Shah Wali(RH)" is celebrated on "28 June" every year and "27 June" in leap years.

Geography 
It is geographically located at the eastern side of Pakistan. It has one inundated canal which passes through the town. The Nala Dek flows to the north west of Qila Sobha Singh.

Demography 
The local population of this town belongs to different castes of which KHOKHAR, Kashmiri, Jutt, Rajput, Gujjar, Ansari etc. are prominent. There are also few homes of migrants from Jammu Kashmir who have permanently settled in Qila Sobha Singh. The main languages spoken in Qila Sobha Singh is Punjabi. According to the 1998 census, 97% of Qila Sobha Singh's population is Muslim. Other religion is Christians 2.40%. Qila Sobha Singh is a mishmash of posh urban and rustic rural environs.

Places of visit 
There is only one major place of visit in the town that is the fort (Qila) which used to be occupied by the Hindu ruler. Now this historical place has considerably vandalised and a government primary school is working at that place. This place is in the centre of the town and overlooks the whole town like the Cidade de Deus, Rio de Janeiro in Brazil. The worship place of saint (Sufi) Balaq Shah Wali also adjacent to its back.

Transportation 
Public Transport is available from all sides of the town. One can reach the town through train and bus as well. If you are coming from Lahore you can take train which departs at 03:45 PM daily and takes approximately 3 hours to reach the town. There is only one daily train service which serves the town directly, 3 trains from Lahore to Narowal and you can reach town by bus from Narowal to town. You can also travel to the town through public bus and hiace, but you might have to change the bus from Narowal if you are coming from Lahore. If you are coming from Islamabad then you have to change the bus at Sialkot. There is also direct bus service from Rawalpindi Pir Wadahai Bus Stop but it runs after 1 hour. There is no proper schedule of bus service from Islamabad. At night time one might face problem of public transport. The fare from Lahore to the town is 200PKR and from Islamabad 450PKR. The fare of bus is relatively low as compared with the hiace. At 3:15PM a Hiace departs daily from Pir Wadhai, Rawalpindi bus stop the last terminus of this hiace is Talwandi Bhindran but it passes through the town.

Medical facility 
There is one basic health unit situated near the Train Station, on Thana Road. There are two Medical Officers in the hospital and one lady health visitor. This hospital was visited by the then Chief Minister, Mr. Shehbaz Sharif, in 1997 and it presented wonky and desolate look to the C.M.

Economy 
The main crops of the town are rice, wheat and vegetables. The poor people of the town also visit the adjacent city, Sialkot, for work in factories. The people also sew footballs in order to be the breadwinners of their family. There are shops at minuscule level which cater the needs of the town inhabitants. Harbans lal chairman International Group Ludhiana is the most notable person born and brought up at Qila Sobha Singh, He started as a labourer in a mechanical workshop and by sheer hardwork and sincerity he established industrial group in Ludhiana.

Religious places 
There is a shrine of an illustrious saint (Sufi) Balaq Shah Wali. He belongs to the genealogy of saints. That is revealed in the book of hagiography. He converted many non-believers to Islam. There are also few religious schisms which remain busy in proselytising the dwellers of the town to Islamic teachings ordained by the prophet Muhammad. Pir Syed Jamaat Ali Shah Naqsbandi-Mujaddidi (c.1840 -1951) belonged to Ali Pur Syedan a village near Qila Sobha Singh. He came from Shiraz, a city in Iran, and belonged to genealogy of saints. Plenty of people visit the shrine of Jamat Ali Shah annually as a religious fervour.
Qila Sobha Singh is surrounded by the shrines of different saints.

Culture 
The native language of the town is Punjabi. The culture of the town dwellers is hotchpotch of different cultures the young generation is clad in western style but those who love to observe shibboleths mostly wear Shalwar kameez.

Areas in vicinity 
The adjacent areas or villages to Qila Sobha Singh are Bhagh, Lalla, Kotli Sanghay, Maan, and Dhamthal on south east side. On east side, khemonwali, Noonar, Muslmanian and Badocheeda villages lie. On south west Sojowali, Ali Pur Syedan Sharif, Baanghy, Osaaha(Wsaya), Puhla and Takhtpur lie. On west side Dera Sulehrian is the famous dera in town. This dera attach two districts Narowal and Sialkot.
Qila Ahmad has different mahalas, but mahala Badhai is a mahala of Qila Ahmad Abad near the railway station. This does not exist on google maps I want to try ad this mahala on google maps.

References

Populated places in Narowal District
Narowal District